The Immortal Otis Redding is a posthumous studio album by American soul recording artist Otis Redding, released in June 1968 by Atco Records. It compiles 11 songs recorded by Redding in a three-week stretch of sessions that concluded days prior to his death in December 1967. "The Happy Song (Dum-Dum)" was the only song previously released, having been a single in April 1968. The Immortal Otis Redding featured four charting singles including "The Happy Song", "I've Got Dreams to Remember", "Amen", and "Hard to Handle".

Critical reception and legacy 
Writing for Creem magazine in 1977, Robert Christgau called The Immortal Otis Redding his favorite album by Redding and "probably among my five most-played LPs", because it "showcases the unduplicated warmth, tenderness, and humor of his ballad singing". The following year, it was voted the 33rd best album ever in Paul Gambaccini's poll of prominent rock critics, published in his book Rock Critics' Choice: The Top 200 Albums. Christgau ranked it third in a list accompanying the book. The album was included in "A Basic Record Library" of 1950s and 1960s recordings, published in Christgau's Record Guide: Rock Albums of the Seventies (1981).

Music critic Dave Marsh gave the album five stars in The New Rolling Stone Record Guide (1983). Lindsay Planer of AllMusic gave it three-and-a-half stars and said although it "wasn't quite on par with" Redding's several other studio albums, the songs on The Immortal Otis Redding were "welcome (if not mandatory) additions to all manner of listeners".

Track listing

Personnel 
Credits adapted from Allmusic.
 Otis Redding – vocals
 Booker T. Jones, Isaac Hayes – keyboards, piano 
 Steve Cropper – guitar, producer 
 Donald Dunn – bass guitar
 Al Jackson Jr. – drums 
 Wayne Jackson – trumpet  
 Andrew Love, Joe Arnold – tenor saxophone

Charts

Album

Singles

References

External links 
 

1968 albums
Otis Redding albums
Albums produced by Steve Cropper
Atco Records albums
Albums published posthumously